Mad Dog and Glory is a 1993 American crime comedy-drama film directed by John McNaughton and starring Robert De Niro, Uma Thurman, and Bill Murray, and supporting roles from well known actors Richard Belzer and David Caruso as De Niro's partner.

Plot
Wayne Dobie is a shy Chicago Police Department crime scene photographer who has spent years on the job without ever drawing his gun; his colleagues jokingly call him "Mad Dog". Wayne saves the life of mob boss Frank Milo during a hold-up in a convenience store. Milo offers Wayne a gift in return: for one week, he will have the "personal services" of Glory, a young woman who works as a bartender at Milo's club.

Wayne learns that Glory is trying to pay off a personal debt and wants nothing to do with Milo after the debt is paid off. After an awkward start, they fall in love. Wayne wants her to move into his apartment, but Milo has no intention of letting Glory go, saying that he owns her. When Wayne doesn't comply, Milo sends one of his thugs, Harold, to take Glory away by force, but Wayne's partner Mike is waiting and beats Harold in a fight. Milo tells Wayne that he has to pay $40,000 to give Glory her freedom.

Glory rejects Wayne's attempts to buy her freedom, as she feels it represents her accepting being owned. As she walks down the street, Milo shows up. Wayne did his best to get the money, but falls short by $12,500. With Harold and an arriving Mike looking on, Wayne stands up to Milo himself, and after impulsively drawing his gun, ends up brawling with Milo in the street. Glory intervenes, suspecting that Milo might kill Wayne. Seeing that the two are in love with each other, Milo concedes and makes peace with Wayne and lets Glory go with no strings attached.

Cast
 Robert De Niro as Wayne 'Mad Dog' Dobie
 Uma Thurman as Glory
 Bill Murray as Frank Milo
 David Caruso as Mike
 Mike Starr as Harold
 Tom Towles as Andrew the Beater
 Kathy Baker as Lee
 Derek Anunciation as Shooter
Other small appearances include J. J. Johnston as Shanlon, Jack Wallace as Tommy, comedian Richard Belzer as M.C. / Comic, and the film's screenwriter Richard Price as the Detective in Restaurant.

Production
According to a profile of producer Steven A. Jones written by Luke Ford, the film was delayed by a year because of studio-required changes. Jones and director McNaughton were contractually required to deliver the film with no changes to the script written by Price. Universal test-screened the film, then insisted on reshooting the film's final scene. As written, when Milo and Wayne fight, Milo dominates Wayne. Wayne's one connecting punch did no damage, but did serve to prompt Milo to realize that Glory was not worth fighting over.

It was reshot to respond to an audience typecasting of De Niro, whom they saw as the Raging Bull he had played more than a decade earlier. Those who saw the test screenings could not accept the fact that De Niro's Wayne had done so poorly against Murray's Milo.

Other reshoots for the film were done to make Glory seem less manipulative and Milo more of a puppet-master behind Glory's actions.

Reception
Review aggregation website Rotten Tomatoes reported 77% of 31 critics gave the film a positive review, with an average rating of 6.3/10. The site's critics consensus states: "Inspired casting and a prevailing sweetness make Mad Dog and Glory an oddball treat." On Metacritic the film has a weighted average score of 71 out of 100, based on 19 critics, indicating "generally favorable reviews". Audiences surveyed by CinemaScore gave the film an average grade C+ on an A+ to F scale.

Roger Ebert, writing for the Chicago Sun-Times, gave the film 3.5 out of 4 stars, saying, "The movie is very funny, but it's not broad humor, it's humor born of personality quirks and the style of the performances." He went on to add that the film is "the kind of movie I like to see more than once. The people who made it must have come to know the characters very well, because although they seem to fit into broad outlines, they are real individuals—quirky, bothered, worried, bemused." Vincent Canby of The New York Times also gave the film a positive review, calling it "a first-rate star vehicle for the big, explosive talents of Mr. De Niro, Mr. Murray and Richard Price, who wrote the screenplay." Expanding on the performances, Canby said, "The great satisfaction of Mad Dog and Glory is watching Mr. De Niro and Mr. Murray play against type with such invigorating ease." Todd McCarthy of Variety called the film "A pleasurably offbeat picture that manages the rare trick of being both charming and edgy".

The film grossed $10.7 million in the United States and Canada and $13 million internationally for a worldwide total of $23.7 million.

References

External links

 
 
 
 
 

1990s romantic comedy-drama films
1990s crime comedy-drama films
1993 films
American crime comedy-drama films
American romantic comedy-drama films
Films directed by John McNaughton
Films set in Chicago
Films scored by Elmer Bernstein
Films shot in Chicago
Films with screenplays by Richard Price (writer)
Fictional portrayals of the Chicago Police Department
Fictional trios
Mafia comedy films
Universal Pictures films
1990s English-language films
1990s American films